Battle of Utria took place during the Estonian War of Independence on 17–20 January 1919 at Udria beach. It was amphibious landing of Estonian forces consisting mainly of Finnish volunteers.

Background

Estonian forces
The naval Taskforce was under the command of Admiral Johan Pitka, he was supported by the Swedish naval officer Martin Ekström and by Captain Aleksander Paulus and Captain Anto Nestori Eskola. The invasion force consisted of roughly 1,900 soldiers under the command of Colonel Martin Ekström.

Soviet forces
Elements of the 6th Rifle Division defending the area were under the command of Nikolai Ivanov. In total the Soviets were able to muster a force of 2,700 men to defend the area from the Estonian military.

Aftermath
The successful landing undertaken by the Estonian military, enabled Estonian units to liberate the border town of Narva on 19 January 1919.

References

Battles of the Estonian War of Independence
Ida-Viru County
1919 in Estonia
January 1919 events